The 1994 Czech Republic motorcycle Grand Prix was the eleventh round of the 1994 Grand Prix motorcycle racing season. It took place on 21 August 1994 at the Masaryk Circuit located in Brno, Czech Republic.

Australian Mick Doohan would secure the first of his five consecutive world championships in the 500cc class by winning the race, as with three races to go, he could no longer be caught in the championship standings.

500 cc classification

250 cc classification

125 cc classification

References

Czech Republic motorcycle Grand Prix
Czech Republic
Motorcycle Grand Prix